Philip Kenneth Callow (26 October 1924 – 22 September 2007) was an English novelist known for his autobiographical portrayals of working-class life. During a long career as a writer, he published 16 novels, poetry, and several biographies of artists and authors, including Vincent van Gogh, D. H. Lawrence, Anton Chekhov, Walt Whitman, and Paul Cézanne.

Life
Callow was born into a working-class family in Stechford, near Birmingham. In 1930, his family moved to Coventry, where he spent the rest of his childhood. He attended Coventry Technical College, and at the age of 15 was apprenticed as a toolmaker at the Coventry Gauge and Tool Company. In 1948, he became a clerk at the ministries of war and supplies, where he worked for three years. He later moved to Plymouth and became a clerk at the South West Electricity Board. 

His first novel, The Hosanna Man, appeared in 1956, but was withdrawn by the publisher over a threatened libel suit. According to a present-day commentator, "The flair he would display as both a novelist and biographer is very much in evidence." Though he continued writing novels, he returned to school in the 1960s, attending Exmouth College of Education, where he trained as a teacher. In the 1970s and 1980s, he taught creative writing at various universities, and turned to writing biographies, starting with Son and Lover, a biography of D. H. Lawrence published in 1975. From 1980 to 1986, he was appointed writer-in-residence at Sheffield Polytechnic. 

Callow was married to Irene Christian Vallance (1952–1973), Penelope Jane Newman (1974–1987), and Anne Jennifer Golby (1987–2007). He had one daughter from his first marriage, Fleur Alyse Harvey.

Work

Early novels
Callow's first novel, The Hosanna Man (1956), is a portrayal of a Midlands artist inspired by Callow's own life. The main character, Louis, moves from Coventry to Nottingham to pursue both a career as an artist and an affair with a married woman, Stella. Louis meets a cast of bohemians and other artists as he attempts to develop his skills in painting watercolors and writing poetry. Though the novel was met with some positive reviews, it was withdrawn by the publisher after a Nottingham bookseller claimed to recognize himself in one of the characters. The bookseller threatened to sue for libel, and the publisher, fearing a lawsuit, pulped the remaining copies. 

In his second novel, Common People (1958), Callow continued his autobiographical exploration of the life of Midlands artists. The novel's protagonist, Nick Chapman, is torn between his dream of pursuing a career as an artist in London and his desire to settle down and "know common joys" in his home town of Woodfield. Common People was chosen as one of the Sunday Times best books of the year by John Betjeman, who said that Callow's writing "sounds like a genuine cry from a class usually silent in the literary world."

In subsequent novels, including Native Ground (1959), A Pledge for the Earth (1960), and Clipped Wings (1963), Callow experimented with non-autobiographical subject matter and third-person narration.

Another Flesh trilogy
Callow's "best-received and appreciated fictional work" was the trilogy Going to the Moon (1968), The Bliss Body (1969), and Flesh of the Morning (1971), later released in an omnibus volume as Another Flesh. Like much of his work, the trilogy is set in the midlands and has autobiographical elements. In his review of The Bliss Body, Robert Baldick praised Callow as "the master of the literary cliffhanger."

Biographies
At the suggestion of his agent, Callow began writing biographies of authors and artists he admired. He began with Son and Lover (1975), a biography of fellow working-class author D. H. Lawrence, to whom Callow has often been compared. He continued writing biographies until the end of his life, including accounts of Vincent van Gogh, Anton Chekhov, Walt Whitman, Paul Cézanne, and others. His biographies have been both praised and criticized for their "exuberant style" and "conscious rejection of objectivity."

Late works
Writing autobiographies reinvigorated Callow both creatively and financially, and he returned to fiction with The Painter's Confession (1989), Some Love (1991), and The Magnolia (1994). His last published non-fiction work was Passage From Home, an autobiographical text published in 2002. Callow also wrote poetry sporadically throughout his life, publishing over a dozen such volumes.

Reception
Callow's work was consistently met with praise from critics. Penelope Mortimer of the Sunday Times called Common People "The most brilliantly successful account of English working-class life I have ever encountered in any medium," while Isabel Quigly praised the novel as "alive", calling it "the direct stuff of life, so direct it scarcely has the form of fiction, so present it is painful, so truthful it is cleansing, salutary and exhilarating." V. S. Naipaul called Callow's prose "clear and easy and elegant" and his observations of people and settings "sharp but kind and never superficial." Margaret Drabble also praised Callow's fairness and accuracy: "By some happy balance of insight and sympathy, Philip Callow manages to engage attention and understanding without alienating common sense." J. B. Priestley praised his "admirable and indeed all-too-rare truth, sincerity and sensitiveness" and said that his prose was "[d]one beautifully, with fine economy." Some scholars include Callow as a member of the Angry Young Men, a loosely-affiliated group of post-war working-class authors.

Bibliography

Novels
The Hosanna Man, Cape, 1956
Common People, Heinemann, 1958
Native Ground, 1959
A Pledge for the Earth, Heinemann, 1960
Clipped Wings, Times Press, 1963
Going to the Moon, MacGibbon and Kee, 1968
The Bliss Body, MacGibbon and Kee, 1969
Flesh of Morning, Bodley Head, 1971
Yours, Bodley Head, 1972
The Story of My Desire, Bodley Head, 1976
Janine, Bodley Head, 1977
The Subway to New York, Martin Brian and O'Keeffe, 1979
Another Flesh, Omnibus edition of Going to the Moon, The Bliss Body and Flesh of the Morning, Allison and Busby, 1989
The Painter's Confessions, Allison and Busby, 1989
Some Love, Allison and Busby, 1991
The Magnolia, Allison and Busby, 1994

Biographies
Son and Lover: The Young D.H. Lawrence, 1975
Van Gogh: A Life 1990
From Noon to Starry Night: A Life of Walt Whitman, 1992
Lost Earth: A Life of Cezanne, 1995
Chekhov: The Hidden Ground: A Biography, 1998
Louis: A Life of Robert Louis Stevenson, 2001
Body of Truth: D. H. Lawrence, the Nomadic Years, 2003

Poetry
Turning Point, London, Heinemann, 1964
The Real Life: New Poems, Times Press, 1964
Bare Wires, Chatto and Windus-Hogarth Press, 1972
Cave Light, Rivelin Press, 1981
New York Insomnia and Other Poems, RivelinGrapheme Press, 1984
Icons, Bradford, Blue Bridge Press, 1987
Soliloquies of an Eye, Littlewood Press, 1990
Notes over a Chasm, Redbeck Press, 1991
Fires in October, Redbeck Press, 1994

Autobiographies
In My Own Land, photographs by James Bridgen, 1965
Passage From Home, 2002

Short stories
"Native Ground," Heinemann, 1959
"Woman with a Poet," Rivelin Press, 1983
"Merry Christmas," in New Statesman (London), 22 December 1961

Stage play
The Honeymooners (televised 1960), published in New Granada Plays, Faber, 1961

Radio plays
The Lamb, 1971 
On Some Road, 1979

Television play
The Honeymooners, 1960

References

See also
Proletarian literature

1924 births
2007 deaths
20th-century English novelists
20th-century English poets
English autobiographers
English biographers